Armstrong High School may refer to:

In the United States 
Armstrong High School (Illinois) Armstrong, Illinois
 Armstrong High School (Washington, D.C.)
Armstrong Manual Training School Washington, D.C. 
Robbinsdale Armstrong High School, Plymouth, Minnesota
Armstrong High School (Virginia), Richmond, Virginia
Armstrong High School (Wisconsin), the former name of Neenah High School in Neenah, Wisconsin